Oyo is an ancient city in Oyo State, Nigeria. It was founded as the capital of the remnant of the historic Oyo empire in the 1830s, and is known to its people as 'New Oyo' (Ọ̀yọ́ Àtìbà) to distinguish it from the former capital to the north, 'Old Oyo' (Ọ̀yọ́-Ilé), which had been deserted as a result of the Yoruba Revolutionary Wars. Its inhabitants are mostly of the Yoruba people, and its ruler is the Alaafin of Oyo.

History

Due to the dominant position that the Oyo empire had in medieval West Africa, the members of the Oyo clan of the Yoruba people were commonly thought of as being the tribe's ruling elite. This was true to such an extent, in fact, that the Yoruba historian Samuel Johnson reported that the Egbas - who began as an Oyo offshoot - once determined social rank within their clan by way of whether or not an Egba could trace his or her descent back to Oyo.

Education
Oyo is home to five higher institutions; these are the Federal College of Education (Special), Ajayi Crowther University, Emmanuel Alayande College of Education (Erelu Campus and Isokun Campus), Surveying Federal School of Surveying (The only school of surveying in Sub-sahara Africa), and Atiba University.

It houses numerous public and private secondary schools such as Oke-Olola Community Schools, Olivet Baptist High School, School of Science, Saint Benardine Girls Grammar School, Ladigbolu Grammar School, Oranyan Grammar School, Emmanuel Alayande Model High School, Aatan Baptist Comprehensive High School, Shepherd's Field International College, Golden Valley Academy, Nesto College, SPED International College etc.

There are numerous primary schools both private and public with new crop of alleged "mushroom" private schools.

Commerce
The major markets in the city include the Akesan market, the Ajegunle market, the Owode market, the Saabo market, Oparinde (Oja-Oke) market and the Irepo market.

Oyo houses branches of different banks such as GT Bank (Owode), First bank, Zenith Bank, Access Bank, Eco Bank, United Bank for Africa etc and some other microfinance banks and cooperatives. It also has grocery stores and supermarkets such as the Ace Supermarket, Joba Pharmacy and Stores, Labake Stores, Jara Supermarket etc. The city is the home of many hangout spots such as the Old Oyo National Park which contains a museum(holding artifacts from the ancient Òyó Empire) and a few animals. Some hotels in Oyo include Labamba Hotel, Tees resort and bar, Begonia hotel, Adesh Hotel, Gold N Rock Hotel, Galaxy Hotel etc.

Local governance and location
The city has four LGAs viz: Atiba LGA, headquartered at Offa-Meta; Oyo East LGA, headquartered at Kosobo; Oyo West LGA, headquartered at Ojongbodu and Afijio LGA, headquartered at Jobele.

The city is centrally located on the dual carriage A1 expressway from Lagos which links it from Ibadan all the way to "Ilorin

Popular culture
Death and the King's Horseman, a play by the Nobel laureate Wole Soyinka, is based on an incident that happened in Oyo in 1946.
The Palace Owner, a praise poem by Basit Ajibade is based on the prowess of Oyo kings.

Notable people 

Chief Fela Sowande (1905–1987), a musician and composer
Chief Wande Abimbola (born 1932), an academician, former Vice Chancellor of the University of Ife and former Senate Majority Leader of the Federal Republic of Nigeria
Gbenga Oluokun (born 1983), a heavyweight boxer
Quadri Aruna (born 1988), a table tennis player 
Najeem Olukokun (born 1990), a footballer
Olaniyi Afonja (born 1974), an actor and comedian
Adebayo Faleti, a writer and actor 
Archbishop Ayo Ladigbolu (born 1938), Clergyman
Monsurat Sunmonu (born 1960), Senator of the Federal Republic of Nigeria and former Speaker, Oyo State House of Assembly
Babajide David (born 1996), football player

References

Notes
 

Populated places in Oyo State
Cities in Yorubaland
Cities in Nigeria
1830s establishments in Africa